Toriko is a Japanese manga series written and illustrated by Mitsutoshi Shimabukuro. It was published by Shueisha – chapterwise in the manga anthology Weekly Shōnen Jump from May 19, 2008 to November 21, 2016. Its chapters were collected in 43 tankōbon volumes. It follows the adventure of Toriko, a Gourmet Hunter, as he searches for rare, diverse foods to complete a full-course meal. On his journey, he is accompanied by the timid chef Komatsu who wants to improve his skills.

In North America, Viz Media released the series in English starting on June 1, 2010 and chapterwise (starting at chapter 171) in Weekly Shonen Jump (originally named Weekly Shonen Jump Alpha) from the debut issue on January 30, 2012. In Australasia, the English volumes are distributed by Madman Entertainment since July 10, 2010.


Volume list

References

Toriko